The Yankee Clipper is a 65-minute 1927 American adventure film directed by Rupert Julian.  It is set against the maritime rivalry between the United States and Great Britain in the mid-19th century.

Plot
The film opens in England in the court of Queen Victoria. Lord Anthony Huntington, the country's foremost shipbuilder, is tasked with preventing the United States from breaking England's grip on the tea trade. Huntington boasts that his new ship, Lord of the Isles, will outsail any American ship.

In America, the U.S. president meets with a Boston shipbuilder, Thomas Winslow, who vows that his new vessel will challenge England's flaunted speed. The builder introduces his son, Hal Winslow (William Boyd), who will command the new Yankee Clipper on its maiden voyage to China. The President tells the young captain that America's hope of prestige on the seas rests with him.

Several days into the journey, a stowaway, a young boy named Mickey Murphy (Junior Coughlan) is found hiding in a burlap sack. The boy is an orphan who announces his hatred of women.

While in China, Winslow attends a dinner hosted by a wealthy Chinese merchant and rescues an English woman Lady Jocelyn Huntington (Elinor Fair) from rioting beggars.

Winslow agrees to a race from China to Boston against the Lord of the Isles. He wins the race and Lady Jocelyn.

Cast
William Boyd ..... Captain Hal Winslow
Elinor Fair ..... Lady Jocelyn Huntington
Junior Coghlan ..... Mickey Murphy
John Miljan ..... Paul de Vigny
Walter Long ..... Portuguese Joe
Louis Payne ..... Lord Huntington
Burr McIntosh ..... Thomas Winslow
Clarence Burton ..... Captain McIntosh

Production credits
 Rupert Julian, director and producer
 Denison Clift, story
 Garrett Weston, adaptation
 John W. Krafft, titles
 John J. Mescall, photographer
 Harold McLernon film editor
 Leigh R. Smith, assistant director

Reception
Following the film's screen debut in Pittsburgh, The Pittsburgh Press called it "a screen classic that will rank among the best of the season's output."

The website AllMovie gave the film a rating of three stars.

References

External links
 

1927 films
American black-and-white films
American silent feature films
1920s historical adventure films
Sailing films
Films set in the 19th century
American historical adventure films
Producers Distributing Corporation films
Films with screenplays by Garrett Fort
1920s American films
Silent historical adventure films
1920s English-language films